The Farm in the Small Marsh may refer to:

The Farm in the Small Marsh (film), 1976 Yugoslav film
The Farm in the Small Marsh (TV series), 1975 Yugoslav TV series
Ja sam rođen tamo na salašu, Serbian patriotic song